Araeosoma coriaceum is a species of sea urchin of the family Echinothuriidae. Their armour is covered with spines. It is placed in the genus Araeosoma and lives in the sea. Araeosoma coriaceum was first scientifically described in 1879 by Alexander Emanuel Agassiz, an American scientist.

See also 
 Araeosoma belli
 Araeosoma coriacea
 Araeosoma eurypatum

References 

coriaceum
Animals described in 1879